Douglas Stubbs (1927–2008) was an Australian artist. Born in the country town of Leongatha in South Gippsland, Victoria he arrived in Melbourne as a young man to study at art school. Stubbs studied at the National Gallery School in Melbourne. Best known for his colourful surrealist paintings, frequently of birds, he held the first of several exhibitions in Melbourne in 1964.Sometimes described as "naive art", his highly imaginative works have been displayed in galleries all over the country. Stubbs is considered to be an under-recognised artist.

References 

 World Encyclopedia of NAIVE ART published by # Chartwell Books Inc, USA 1984 
 Encyclopedia of Australian Art Vol 2 by Alan NcCulloch published by # Hutchinson Group Pty Ltd 1984 
 Australian Artists Today by Graeme Norris published by # Graeme Norris (1st edition 1974, 2nd edition 1979, 3rd edition 1984)

1927 births
2008 deaths
People from Leongatha
20th-century Australian painters
20th-century Australian male artists
Australian male painters